The 2016 Western Canada Cup was the Western Canadian Junior A ice hockey championship played at Affinity Place in Estevan, Saskatchewan from April 30 to May 8, 2016. It determined the two Western seeds for the 2016 Royal Bank Cup, the West Kelowna Warriors and Brooks Bandits.

Round robin

Tie Breaker: Head-to-Head, then 3-way +/-.

Results 

Schedule and results can be found on the official website.

Semi and Finals

References

External links
Hockey Canada

See also
2016 Royal Bank Cup
Western Canada Cup

Western Canada Cup
Western Canada Cup 2016
Sport in Estevan
Ice hockey competitions in Saskatchewan
April 2016 sports events in Canada
May 2016 sports events in Canada
2016 in Saskatchewan